Hashim A. Sarkis (Arabic: هاشم سركيس ; born 1964 in Beirut) is a Lebanese educator and architect. Since 2015, Sarkis has been Professor and Dean of the School of Architecture and Planning at the Massachusetts Institute of Technology. He is also founding principal of Hashim Sarkis Studios since 1998.

Career
Born in Beirut, Sarkis received his Bachelor of Architecture and Bachelor of Fine Arts from the Rhode Island School of Design (1987), his Master of Architecture with distinction (1989), and his Doctor of Philosophy from the Harvard University Graduate School of Design (1995). His dissertation was entitled "Publics and Architects: Re-Engaging Design in the Democracy," and was advised by Peter G. Rowe, K. Michael Hays, Jorge Silvetti, and Roberto Mangabeira Unger.

Sarkis has worked for several architecture firms, including for Rafael Moneo on Beirut Souks. In 1998, Sarkis established his own practice, Hashim Sarkis Studios, with offices in Cambridge and Beirut. From 1995 to 2015, Sarkis was a professor at the Harvard University Graduate School of Design, where he taught design studios and courses on the history and theory of architecture and urban design. From 2002 to 2014, he was the Aga Khan Professor of Landscape Architecture and Urbanism at the Harvard GSD.

In 2018, he was named curator of the 2020 Venice Biennale of Architecture.

Works

Completed
2004 - Agricultural and Community Center, Mejdlaya
2004 - Balloon Landing Park, Beirut
2004 - Oceana Beach Club, Damour
2004 - Olive Oil Press, Batroun
2005 - Wareham Street Loft, Boston
2007 - Oleana Restaurant, Cambridge
2007 - Housing for the Fishermen of Tyre, Abbasiyeh
2009 - Al Zorah, Ajman
2010 - Boston Eye Group, Brookline
2010 - Tremont Street Residence, Boston
2011 - The Street Pavilion, Shenzhen
2016 - Byblos Town Hall, Byblos
2016 - Dana Street House, Cambridge
2017 - The Courtowers, Beirut
2018 - Saifi Residence, Beirut

Publications
Projecting Beirut: Episodes in the Construction and Reconstruction of a Modern City, with Peter G. Rowe, 1998, 
Case: Le Corbusier's Venice Hospital and the Mat Building Revival, 2001, 
Circa 1958: Lebanon in the Pictures and Plans of Constantinos Doxiadis, 2003, 
Josep Lluis Sert: The Architecture of Urban Design, 1953-1969, 2008, 
 "The World as an Architectural Project," by Hashim Sarkis and Roi Salgueiro with Gabriel Kozlowski, 2020 
 Expansions, 2021 Edited by Hashim Sarkis and Ala Tannir, link
 Cohabitats, 2021 Edited by Hashim Sarkis and Ala Tannir, link

On Hashim Sarkis
Hashim Sarkis, Curator of the 17th International Architectural Exhibition, Universes in Universes, link
 Venice Biennale Curator Hashim Sarkis: ”We are exploring the same subject that led to the pandemic”, Edwin Heathcote, Financial Times, 21.05.21, link
 The Venice Biennale, Twice delayed, takes on new relevance, Sam Lubell, New York Times, 20.05.21 link
Hashim Sarkis discusses staging on an international biennale in “interesting times”,  Samuel Medina, 05.05.21, The Architect’s Newspaper link
 Architecture is a medium that can make a difference: In conversation with Hashim Sarkis at the 2021 Venice Architectural Biennale, Christelle Harrouk, 24.05.21, arch daily, link
 Biennale Architettura 2021, press conference, 20.05.21 full video in the Biennale Architettura 2021 website link
 At the Venice Biennale, an architecture exhibition to meet the moment, Peter Dizikes, 08.07.2021. MIT News link
″Golden Lions to Raumlaborberlin and UAE″, John Hill, 30.08.21 World-Architects.com

Personal life
Sarkis is married to Diala Ezzeddine, Chief Executive Officer of Xios Therapeutics, and they have one daughter, Dunia Alexandra.

References

External links
 MIT profile
 HSS profile

1964 births
Living people
Artists from Beirut
Lebanese expatriates in the United States
Lebanese architects
Rhode Island School of Design alumni
Harvard Graduate School of Design alumni
Harvard Graduate School of Design faculty
MIT School of Architecture and Planning faculty